Jack Hunter is a 2008 American archeological adventure film series (in the vein of the Indiana Jones franchise.) It consists of three parts: Jack Hunter and the Lost Treasure of Ugarit, Jack Hunter and the Quest for Akhenaten's Tomb and Jack Hunter and the Star of Heaven with Hunter played by Ivan Sergei.

Plot
Part 1:
The film begins with Jack stealing a stone tablet from a French museum...
Young archaeologist Jack Hunter planned only to take a picture of a cuneiform tablet from once unsurpassed Mesopotamian metropolis Ugarit in present Syria, but is caught and has to steal it from a private museum in France. He refuses to join his mentor, professor Frederic "Freddie" Shaffer, who believes the poem is a coded treasure map, on a relic hunt, until his friend is murdered to steal it. The obvious suspect is Syrian artifact trader Ali, so Jack flies to Damascus. There he must accept working with local, US-educated colleague Nadia and her driver Tariq. Their lives are threatened during the long relic quest, for one by common nemesis Albert Littman, but another secret lurks too.

Part 2:
Akhenaten, a pharaoh who raided Ugarit, stole its treasure and the second piece of the Star of Heaven. If Jack and his team find the tomb, they will find the treasure and the Star. Loads of action and mystery await.

Part 3:
The final piece of the puzzle and final film in the film series. It seems the Romans got to Akhenaten's Tomb first. The race is on to see if Jack and his friends can find the treasure and recover the Iris back from Littmann and the Russians.

Cast

Reception
The series has been described as a low-budget blatant ripoff of Indiana Jones. Jumping Sharks' review described it as: "let me make it crystal clear – this is a completely original miniseries, in no way stealing anything at all from Indiana Jones. 
Nope. No sireee. Well, maybe just a bit. Okay, maybe a bit more than a bit. Oh, alright – they basically copied Indiana Jones, right down to his trademarked hat."

Jack Hunter generally received mixed reviews from critics. One reviewer from Die Welt, did praise the series saying, "As the successor to Indiana Jones, [Jack Hunter] does the adventurer credit."

See also

 Indiana Jones
 Tomb Raider
 The Librarian
 Ark of the Sun God
 Hunters of the Golden Cobra
 Treasure of the Four Crowns
 Uncharted

References

External links 
 
 
 
 

Film series introduced in 2008
2000s American television miniseries
Films set in Syria
Ugarit in popular culture
2000s adventure films